Kalyug Aur Ramayan is a  1987 Hindi film starring Manoj Kumar, Madhavi, Prem Chopra, Om Prakash, Bindu and Rajiv Goswami. The film was directed by Babubhai Mistri and Produced by Shashi Goswami. The music was given by Kalyanji Anandji and lyrics by Maya Govind and Verma Malik

Plot
The film is based on the Ramayana in the modern environment, how his character would be today. Manoj Kumar is portrayed in the film Ram Bhakta Hanuman. Hanuman comes to earth and meet a miserable father Dasaratha. Dasrath distressed by his sons and daughter-in-law. How Hanuman solves this problem, is story's theme.

Cast

Manoj Kumar as Pawan Putra /Shri Hanuman
Rajiv Goswami as Raman
Madhavi as Sarita
Prem Chopra as Bhairon Singh
Om Prakash as Dashrath
Bindu as Kamla
Satish Shah as Police Inspector Thakur Hanuman Singh
Parikshat Sahni as Judge Shyam Diwakar
 Huma Khan  as Kamini
 Urmila Bhatt as Mrs. Sharma
 Abhi Bhattacharya as Mr. Sharma
 Birbal as D'Souza
 Mohan Choti as Stage Actor
 C.S. Dubey as Jagannath
 Amrit Patel as Stage Actor
Sarita Devi as Dashrath's Mother
Bhupendra Singh 
Dinesh Kaushik as Stage Actor
Sonika Gill as Nirmala Sharma
Rahul as Dhaman
Manmauji as Stage actor
 Mushtaq Merchant
 Sudhir Thakur
 Jugnu
 Dolly

Crew
 Director - Babubhai Mistri
 Producer -  Shashi Goswami
 Film Editor - Manoj Kumar 
 Lyricist = Maya Govind, Verma Malik
 Art Director - Jadab Bhattacharya
 Costume Designer - Xerxes Bathena, Kukki Malhotra, R.V. Naidu
 Production Management - Sudhir Thakur
 Assistant Director - Naresh Khanna, Vicky Mohla, Vijay Kumar Naidu, Amar Pal Singh
 Special Effects - K.K. Mathur (title), Babubhai Mistri (Special Effects)
 Visual Effects - Vishal Goswami
 Stunts - Mohan Singh Baggad
 Assistant Editor - Ashok Naik
 Color Consultant - R.P. Patwardhan
 Playback Singer - Asha Bhosle, Vishal Goswami, Mahendra Kapoor, Lata Mangeshkar, Sadhana Sargam
 Choreographer - Manohar Naidu

Soundtrack

See also
 Ek Chitthi Pyar Bhari  
 Jeeo Aur Jeene Do 
 Sansar (1987 film) 
 Jawab (1970 film)

References

External links 
 

1987 films
Films scored by Kalyanji Anandji
1980s Hindi-language films
Hanuman in popular culture
Films directed by Babubhai Mistry